John Harewell was a Bishop of Bath and Wells in medieval England.
 
Harewell came from Harwell in Berkshire (now in Oxfordshire). He was in the employ of the Black Prince, before being collated Archdeacon of Berkshire in 1365 and then selected, on 14 December 1366, as Bishop of Bath and Wells. He was consecrated on 7 March 1367 and died around 16 July 1386. His executors are listed as John Harewell; John Bryngton; John Grene, of Welles, canon; John de Tuttebury, in 1399 (1 Henry IV).

Citations

References

External links
Royal Berkshire History: John Harewell (d. 1386)

1386 deaths
People from Vale of White Horse (district)
Bishops of Bath and Wells
Archdeacons of Berkshire
Year of birth unknown